Tastemaker may refer to:

Tastemaker (EP)
Tastemaker Award
Tastemaker Music (a.k.a. The Tastemakers)  a record production company
Tastemakers Billboard charts